Sadowy, a Polish surname, may refer to:

  (1925–1984), Polish diver 
 Dylan Sadowy, Canadian ice hockey player acquired by the Tulsa Oilers in 2021
  (born 1962), Polish handball player, representative of Poland 
  (born 1980), Polish fencer, exterminator, representative of Poland 
 Witold Sadowy (1920–2020), Polish theater and film actor, theater journalist

See also
 Sadowy Stok, a settlement in Podlaskie Voivodeship, Poland
 Sadovy (disambiguation)
 Sadowsky